Neola is a census-designated place (CDP) in Duchesne County, Utah, United States. The population was 461 at the 2010 census. Neola was established in 1912.

Geography

Climate
According to the Köppen Climate Classification system, Neola has a semi-arid climate, abbreviated "BSk" on climate maps.

Demographics

As of the census of 2000, there were 533 people, 170 households, and 139 families residing in the CDP. The population density was 76.0 people per square mile (29.4/km2). There were 190 housing units at an average density of 27.1/sq mi (10.5/km2). The racial makeup of the CDP was 85.18% White, 10.32% Native American, 0.19% Asian, 0.19% Pacific Islander, 0.56% from other races, and 3.56% from two or more races. Hispanic or Latino of any race were 2.63% of the population.

There were 170 households, out of which 44.1% had children under the age of 18 living with them, 70.6% were married couples living together, 9.4% had a female householder with no husband present, and 18.2% were non-families. 15.9% of all households were made up of individuals, and 9.4% had someone living alone who was 65 years of age or older. The average household size was 3.14 and the average family size was 3.52.

In the CDP, the population was spread out, with 35.5% under the age of 18, 8.3% from 18 to 24, 25.5% from 25 to 44, 19.5% from 45 to 64, and 11.3% who were 65 years of age or older. The median age was 31 years. For every 100 females, there were 96.0 males. For every 100 females age 18 and over, there were 95.5 males.

The median income for a household in the CDP was $38,214, and the median income for a family was $40,625. Males had a median income of $35,500 versus $25,000 for females. The per capita income for the CDP was $13,138. About 10.6% of families and 14.1% of the population were below the poverty line, including 16.7% of those under age 18 and 9.1% of those age 65 or over.

See also

 List of census-designated places in Utah
 Neola North Fire

References

External links

Census-designated places in Duchesne County, Utah
Census-designated places in Utah
Populated places established in 1912
1912 establishments in Utah